Paweł Leśniak (born 22 February 1989) is a Polish former footballer who is last known to have played as a midfielder for MFK Tatran Liptovský Mikuláš.

Career

Before the second half of 2007–08, Leśniak signed for Polish third tier side Kolejarz Stróże. In 2010, he signed for Sandecja Nowy Sącz in the Polish second tier, where he made 24 appearances and scored 0 goals. On 29 August 2010, Leśniak debuted for Sandecja Nowy Sącz during a 2-1 win over Kolejarz Stróże. In 2014, he signed for Slovak club MFK Tatran Liptovský Mikuláš but left due to not being registered within the deadline. At the age of 26, he retired from professional football to become an author.

References

External links

 

Polish footballers
Living people
Polish expatriate sportspeople in Slovakia
Association football midfielders
1989 births
III liga players
II liga players
Kolejarz Stróże players
MFK Tatran Liptovský Mikuláš players
Sandecja Nowy Sącz players
I liga players
Expatriate footballers in Slovakia
Polish expatriate footballers
Sportspeople from Nowy Sącz